The Arc Dome Wilderness is a protected wilderness area in the Toiyabe Range of Nye County, in the central section of the state of Nevada in the western United States. Attractions include the -long Toiyabe Crest Trail offers travelers atop the ridge of the Toiyabe Range, including  within the Arc Dome Wilderness.

Wildlife in the Wilderness includes Columbia spotted frog, mule deer, sharp-shinned hawk, golden eagle, Clark's nutcracker, sagebrush sparrow, sagebrush vole, black-throated gray warbler, yellow warbler, northern goshawk, big brown bat, and Great Basin skink.

The Arc Dome Wilderness is administered by the Humboldt-Toiyabe National Forest.

See also
Arc Dome
List of U.S. Wilderness Areas
Wilderness Act

References

External links 
 
 

Humboldt–Toiyabe National Forest
Wilderness areas of Nevada
Protected areas of Nye County, Nevada
Protected areas established in 1989
1989 establishments in Nevada